Niranjana Anoop is an Indian actress who appears in Malayalam films. Niranjana is also a trained Bharatanatyam and Kuchipudi dancer.

Career 
Niranjana Anoop made her acting debut through the film Loham directed by Ranjith. Her 2017 release includes the Malayalam language film Puthan Panam directed by Ranjith Balakrishnan, starring Mammootty and Iniya in the lead roles. She is associated with the 2018 Malayalam drama film Kala Viplavam Pranayam directed by Jithin Jithu, featuring Anson Paul, Saiju Kurup and Gayathri Suresh as lead characters. Her other 2018 releases include Ira and B. Tech.

Filmography

Dubbing artist

Short films

References

External links
 

Actresses in Malayalam cinema
Living people
Actresses in Tamil cinema
1999 births